Fenley is a surname. Notable people with the surname include:

Molissa Fenley (born 1954), American choreographer
Stanley Fenley (1896–1972), English cricketer
Warren Fenley (1922–2009), American basketball player

See also
Finley (name)
Henley (name)